Petronas Office Tower or Petronas Tower 4 is an office building for Petronas in Kota Kinabalu, Sabah, Malaysia.

The Petronas Office Tower is the fourth Petronas Tower after Petronas Tower 3.

Construction of a second 11-storey tower which will be located beside the building was started in 2016 with a cost of RM136.9 million and is set to be complete in August 2018. Its prestressed building structure designed and constructed by YTL Corporation Bhd

References 

Its prestressed building structure designed and constructed by YTL Corporation Bhd

External links 
 

Buildings and structures in Kota Kinabalu